"" (Lord Jesus Christ, true man and God) is a Lutheran hymn by Paul Eber. It is a hymn for the dying.

History 
The hymn appeared in both High German, such as a Frankfurt print of 1563, and in Low German spoken mainly in northern Germany, such as the 1565 hymnal Enchiridion geistliker leder und Psalmen from Hamburg, titled "Ein gebedt tho Christo umme ein salich affscheidt uth dissem bedröneden leuende" (A prayer to Christ for a blessed departure from this troubled life). The hymn has been printed in eight stanzas of six lines, but also in twelve stanzas of four lines each. The tune of "Vater unser im Himmelreich" matched the six-line format, the melody of "Christe, der du bist Tag und Licht" was appropriate for the four-line format.

The hymn was also included early in Catholic hymnals, first in a hymnal by Leisentrit, Geistliche Lieder vnd Psalmen, in 1567, and copied to several others as "Ein gar uraltes katholisches Gebet um ein christliches Ende in Todes-Nöthen, auch Morgens und Abends zu beten aus dem Leisentrit" (A very old prayer for a Christian end in death's pain, also to be prayed in the morning and evening from the Leisentrit).

Lyrics 
The text is given in the six-line format.

Musical settings 
Johannes Eccard set the first two four-line stanzas as a five-part motet. Johann Sebastian Bach used the hymn as the basis for his chorale cantata Herr Jesu Christ, wahr' Mensch und Gott, BWV 127 in 1725.

The hymn was translated to English and has appeared in 33 hymnals. Catherine Winkworth translated it as "Lord Jesus Christ, true man and God" in 1855.

References

External links 
 Johann Heinrich Bodecker, Herr Jesu Christ, wahr’ Mensch und Gott partitura.org 2015
 Herr Jesu Christ, wahr' Mensch und Gott Emans 100 / Chorale setting bach-digital.de

16th-century hymns in German
Lutheran hymns